NGC 2736 (also known as the Pencil Nebula) is a small part of the Vela Supernova Remnant, located near the Vela Pulsar in the constellation Vela.  The nebula's linear appearance triggered its popular name. It resides about 815 light-years (250 parsecs) away from the Solar System.  It is thought to be formed from part of the shock wave of the larger Vela Supernova Remnant.  The Pencil Nebula is moving at roughly 644,000 kilometers per hour (400,000 miles per hour).

History 

On 1 March 1835, John Herschel discovered this object at the Cape of Good Hope and described it as "eeF, L, vvmE; an extraordinary long narrow ray of excessively feeble light; position 19 ±. At least 20' long, extending much beyond the limits of the field...". This agrees perfectly with the ESO- Uppsala listing N2736 = E260-N14, a nebula with dimensions 30'x7', position angle of 20 and notes "Luminous filament". Harold Corwin adds that on the ESO IIIa-F film this nebula is the brightest patch of a huge supernova remnant (Gum Nebula) whose delicate whisps cover the field. A relatively bright star is immersed in N2736 (mentioned by Herschel).

References

External links 

 Space.com article about NGC 2736
 NASA feature 

Gum Nebula
2736
Vela (constellation)